Ingenting att Förlora (Nothing to lose) is the debut studio album by Swedish pop singer Linda Bengtzing and was released on March 13, 2006. The album peaked at number 34 on the Swedish albums chart.

Track listing
Ingenting att förlora
Jag ljuger så bra
Kan du se
Himlen är du
Medan du sov
Alla flickor
Han är min
Ett ögonblick
Vad hände sen
Diamanter
Vem
Nu kommer jag tillbaks
Ingenting är större (duet with Pontus Assarsson)

Singles

 Alla flickor (2005)
 Diamanter (2005)
 Jag ljuger så bra (2006)
 Kan du se (2006)

Charts

Weekly charts

Year-end charts

References

Linda Bengtzing albums
2006 debut albums
Swedish-language albums